The seventh season of Two and a Half Men premiered on CBS on September 21, 2009, and ended on May 24, 2010.

Cast

Main
 Charlie Sheen as Charlie Harper
 Jon Cryer as Alan Harper
 Angus T. Jones as Jake Harper
 Marin Hinkle as Judith Harper-Melnick
 Conchata Ferrell as Berta
 Jennifer Taylor as Chelsea
 Holland Taylor as Evelyn Harper

Recurring
 Ryan Stiles as Herb Melnick
 Kelly Stables as Melissa
 Courtney Thorne-Smith as Lyndsey McElroy
 Graham Patrick Martin as Eldridge McElroy

Guest

 Jane Lynch as Dr. Linda Freeman
 Emmanuelle Vaugier as Mia
 Melanie Lynskey as Rose
 Eddie Van Halen as himself
 Will Sasso as Andrew
 Tinashe Kachingwe as Celeste Burnett
 Annie Potts as Lenore
 Steve Hytner as Dr. Schenkman
 Katy Mixon as Betsy
 Tricia Helfer as Gail
 Carl Reiner as Marty Pepper
 Stacy Keach as Tom
 Meagen Fay as Martha
 Steven Eckholdt as Brad Harlow
 John Amos as Ed
 Frances Fisher as Priscilla Honeycutt
 Amy Hill as Mrs. Wiggins
 Elizabeth Ho as Jasmine
 Martin Mull as Russell
 Katherine LaNasa as Lydia
 Ming-Na Wen as Linda
 Rachel Cannon as Chloe
 Justine Eyre as Gabrielle
 Jodi Lyn O'Keefe as Isabella
 Missi Pyle as Mrs. Pasternak
 Rena Sofer as Chrissy
 Billy Gibbons as himself
 Dusty Hill as himself
 Frank Beard as himself

Production 
The season was originally intended to have 22 episodes, but in November 2009 it was announced that the season was being extended to 24 episodes.  Sheen entered rehab on February 23, 2010, and as a result, taping of the show was suspended; Sheen and the cast returned to the set to resume taping on March 16, 2010. However, as a result of the three-week halt, the number of episodes was reduced back to 22.

Episodes

Ratings

U.S. Nielsen ratings

Canadian ratings

Australian ratings 

Notes

Notes

References

General references 
 
 
 

Season 7
2009 American television seasons
2010 American television seasons